Men's 100m races for athletes with cerebral palsy at the 2004 Summer Paralympics were held in the Athens Olympic Stadium. Events were held in four disability classes.

T35

The T35 event consisted of 2 heats and a final. It was won by Teboho Mokgalagadi, representing .

1st Round

Heat 1
21 Sept. 2004, 21:05

Heat 2
21 Sept. 2004, 21:11

Final Round
22 Sept. 2004, 20:50

T36

The T36 event consisted of 2 heats and a final. It was won by Andriy Zhyltsov, representing .

1st Round

Heat 1
20 Sept. 2004, 10:45

Heat 2
20 Sept. 2004, 10:51

Final Round
21 Sept. 2004, 17:00

T37

The T37 event consisted of 2 heats and a final. It was won by Yang Chen, representing .

1st Round

Heat 1
25 Sept. 2004, 10:35

Heat 2
25 Sept. 2004, 10:41

Final Round
26 Sept. 2004, 20:35

T38

The T38 event consisted of 2 heats and a final. It was won by Tim Sullivan, representing .

1st Round

Heat 1
21 Sept. 2004, 12:10

Heat 2
21 Sept. 2004, 12:16

Final Round
22 Sept. 2004, 20:05

References

M